The Riley Formation is a geologic formation in Texas. It preserves fossils dating back to the Cambrian period.

See also

 List of fossiliferous stratigraphic units in Texas
 Paleontology in Texas

References
 

Cambrian Texas
Cambrian southern paleotropical deposits